Yesi Tatiana Dueñas Gómez (born 31 March 1998) is a Colombian racing cyclist, who currently rides for UCI Women's Continental Team .

References

External links

1998 births
Living people
Colombian female cyclists
Place of birth missing (living people)
21st-century Colombian women
Competitors at the 2018 Central American and Caribbean Games
Competitors at the 2018 South American Games
South American Games gold medalists for Colombia
South American Games medalists in cycling